Motorcycle Grasstrack is a form of track racing which typically, in its current form,  takes place on a flat track consisting of two straights and two bends usually constructed in a field. It is one of the oldest types of motorcycle sports in the UK with the first meetings having taken place in the 1920s.

History 
In the United Kingdom, kidney-shaped circuits were sometimes used to include a right hand bend, and undulating hillsides were also used to increase the challenge for riders. The events traditionally occurred after haymaking and before harvesting season on newly-cut fields. Postwar grasstrack circuits included "permanent" venues such as Brands Hatch and Mallory Park which were not simple oval shapes, although solo motorcycle races were run in an anti-clockwise direction. Later, these were converted into tarmac circuits with races using the more common clockwise direction associated with modern roadracing.

In the modern era, it is generally similar to Speedway with races usually taking place over 4 laps from a standing start. Unlike Speedway, which has 4 riders per race, Grasstrack racing can have many riders in each heat and the circuit is normally longer allowing higher speeds. Grasstrack has three solo classes, 250 cc, 350 cc and 500 cc together with three sidecar classes; left-handed 500 cc and 1000 cc (turning left) and right-handed 1000 cc (turning right).

The British Grasstrack season usually starts in early spring around the Easter holidays and runs through the summer/autumn months. More spectacular racing takes place at larger roped tracks including the Poacher and ASTRA Champion of Champions and Grand Slam meetings in Kent and in particular the most exciting meeting of all at the famous Rhodes Minnis circuit.

The pinnacle of the domestic Grasstrack season is the British Masters Championships. This official ACU championship is where the British champion is crowned in the mainstream 500 cc solo and 1000 cc right hand sidecar classes. Many famous Speedway riders such as 1976 world champion Peter Collins started their racing careers in Grasstrack. Some Speedway riders continue to take part in national Grasstrack meetings when their schedule permits. Grand Prix road racers John Surtees and Gary Hocking also began their racing careers in grass track competitions. Other competitors from the postwar era included now-famous names such as Bernie Ecclestone and Murray Walker.

In Europe the same sport is often called Long Track racing. This is exactly the same setup as British grasstrack which has tracks normally around 600–800 meters in length, but is held on the continent with tracks up to 1000–1200 meters in length and with speeds reaching 90 mph – 100 mph. The machinery used is the same as are the riders.

Grasstrack Motorcycles 

Grasstrack racing motorcycles look quite similar to Speedway machines but there are different engine capacity limits for each class. In the UK there are classes for 250 cc (normally 2 stroke engines), 350 cc and 500 cc bikes (usually 4-stroke engines). Unlike Speedway bikes which have no gears, Grasstrack bikes usually have a 2 speed gearbox. Both Speedway and Grasstrack bike have no brakes. The only other main difference is that speedway bikes have no rear suspension and are shorter in length, usually by around 10–12 inches.

Also there is a class called Pre-75. These are bikes that have been made before 1975. The three classes in Pre-75, are 250, 350 and 500 cc.

As well as solo racing, sidecar racing is also quite popular and often very spectacular. There are mainly three recognised classes, 500 cc (using solo 4-stroke engines) and two 1000 cc classes (using stock road bike engines). Again, they all run on methanol, and the 500 cc class and the 1000cc Lefthand sidecar class run anti-clockwise around the oval track, and the 1000 cc class clockwise. The reason behind the difference in direction is often asked, the main reason being the origin of each class. The 500cc sidecars having been developed in mainland Europe, where drivers drive on the right of the road. The 1000cc sidecar has been developed in the UK where road users drive on the left. Therefore, the sidecar wheel is always found on the nearside of the vehicle.

The fastest recorded oval lap record is held by UK's Kelvin Tatum MBE at Rastede (1000 m Grass/Sand surface) in Germany at an average speed of 144.31 km/h.

Junior Grasstrack 

Riders can start in Grasstrack racing at a young age (6 years old in the UK). Junior Grasstrack clubs cater for riders with motocross bikes as well as Grasstrack machines.

The ACU hold a National Youth Championship each season.

Current ACU British Youth Champions

Organisation 

Whilst there are several Grasstrack racing clubs in the UK, the sport is regulated by the governing body of British motorcycle sport, the Auto Cycle Union (ACU) who organise an annual British championship.

British Championships 
The British Grasstrack Championships take place at two separate events. The 250 cc and 350 cc solo, 500 cc sidecar and 1000 cc Left Hand sidecar championships take place at the ACU British National Championships. The 500 cc Solos and 1000 cc Right Hand Sidecar Champions are decided at the ACU British Masters Championships. Qualification for the National Championships are by way of a National Gradings List. There is a British Masters Qualifying event held to determine qualification for the British Masters Final event.

The British Championships are important events, particularly for 500 cc solo and 500 cc sidecar riders. The results of the championships determine who is to represent the nation on an international level for the FIM World Longtrack Championships and the UEM European Sidecar Championships. More recently a World Championship has emerged for 1000 cc Right Hand sidecars. Qualification is determined on results from both the British Masters event and the British Sidecar Speedway Championships. Many 500 cc solo riders race Grasstrack for their profession, therefore a good result in the British Masters is essential.

British Masters Championship

500cc Solo

1000cc Sidecar

British Grasstrack Championship

Current ACU British Grasstrack Champions

World Championships 
The FIM, the World's motorcycle racing authority run a World Longtrack series as well as a World Team Cup. Although both events are named 'Longtrack', they often are competed for on Grass. The World Longtrack series competitors must either qualify by finishing high enough up the standings the previous year, be selected by the FIM for a 'Wild Card', or compete in a series of qualifiers and the 'Challenge' meeting, held annually.

The World Team Cup involves each team consisting of 3 riders racing each other for points. The top team at the end is the winner. 

The 1000cc Right Hand Sidecars also have their own World Championship, previously known as the 'Sidecar World Cup' and 'Sidecar Gold Cup'. The event usually takes place on speedway circuits, with Sidecar Speedway machines being mostly used.

World Longtrack Championships

World Sidecar Championship

European Championships

FIM Europe hold European Championships for both the 500cc Solos and 500cc Sidecar classes. Qualification for both events is through one of the semi finals, before a One Day Final, where the winner of the 'A' Final at the end of the event is crowned European Champion.

European Solo Championship

European Sidecar Championship

National Championships

A number of countries, where the sport of Grasstrack, and Longtrack, are popular, hold National Championships for a number of different classes. In Great Britain, the 500cc Solos and 1000cc Sidecars have their own Championship, whereas the 250cc, 350cc Solos and 500cc & 1000cc Left-Handed Sidecar champions are decided in a separate event. Other classes, such as Youth and Vintage machines also have their own championships.

Some of the more prestigious National Championships include:

 French Grasstrack Championship 
 British Masters 
 British Grasstrack Championships 
 Dutch Grasstrack Solo Championship 
 Dutch Grasstrack Sidecar Championship 

A number of these countries also hold a National Longtrack Championship

See also 
 Longtrack
 Sidecar Speedway
 Speedway

References

External links 
https://www.fim-moto.com/en/
http://www.acu.org.uk/
 http://grasstrackgb.co.uk/

Motorcycle racing by type
Track racing
Off-road racing
Sports originating in the United Kingdom
Recurring sporting events established in 1951